The tropical parula (Setophaga pitiayumi) is a small New World warbler. It breeds from southernmost Texas and northwest Mexico (Sonora) south through Central America to northern Argentina, including Trinidad and Tobago. This widespread and common species is not considered threatened by the IUCN.

This passerine is not migratory, but northern birds may make local movements. For example, although it does not breed in much of Pacific Central America, it is a regular migrant to countries like El Salvador.

Description

It is 4.3 in (11 cm) long and has mainly blue-grey upperparts, with a greenish back patch and two white wingbars. The underparts are yellow, becoming orange on the  breast. The male has a black patch from the bill to behind the eye.

Females are slightly duller than the males and lacks black on the head. The immature tropical parula is dull-plumaged, lacks the wing bars, and has a grey band on the breast.

The song is a high buzzy trill, and the call is a sharp tsit.

The tropical parula has about 14 subspecies, with a wide range of plumage tones. S. p. graysoni, is endemic to Socorro in the Revillagigedo Islands. Some subspecies (especially insular ones) are occasionally considered separate species.

Setophaga pitiayumi has occasionally been lumped with the closely related northern parula (S. americana) as a single species. Hybrids are routinely found in the Rio Grande Valley of southern Texas, though this may be a recent phenomenon. Most tropical parulas can be distinguished from the northern parula by their lack of white eye crescents, but this may be ambiguous in hybrids.  One should also look for the distribution and extent of non-yellow coloration on the breast, and the extent of yellow below the cheek and on the belly.

In addition, a partially leucistic tropical parula female was seen in 2005, at Reserva Buenaventura in El Oro Province, Ecuador. With several small white areas on the forehead and around the eyes, this bird appeared much like a hybrid, but such birds would only occur as far south as Panama (if they would migrate like the northern parula).

Ecology

The tropical parula is a species mainly of hill and premontane forests, and does not occur in the Amazon basin. It seems to prefer moderately disturbed and secondary forest and seems to cope well with habitat fragmentation. On the eastern slope of the Andes for example it is regularly found at about 3,300–4,300 ft (1,000–1,300 m). There its habitat is a patchy mix containing primary forest (e.g. high Iriartea deltoidea palm woods), wet premontane secondary forest dominated e.g. by Elaeagia (Rubiaceae) and with abundant epiphytes and hemiepiphytes such as Clusiaceae, former clearings overgrown with shrubs, and fresh forest edges.

S. p. graysoni mostly keeps to low woody vegetation, typically Croton masonii shrubs, a few feet (some 1–1.5 meters) above ground; they are more terrestrial than other subspecies of the tropical parula and often can be seen hopping on the ground – though probably less so where feral cats are abundant.

These birds feed on insects, spiders and occasionally berries. They may be seen to attend mixed-species feeding flocks, in some locations (e.g. in the Serra de Paranapiacaba) commonly, but often just coincidentally.

The tropical parula nests in clumps of epiphytes (especially Spanish moss, Tillandsia usneoides) in a tree,  laying usually two eggs in a scantily lined domed nest. Incubation is 12–14 days, mainly by the female. On Socorro Island, the breeding season is probably in the summer months, and by November, the young appear to have fledged.

Gallery

References

Further reading
 Curson, Jon; Quinn, David & Beadle David (1994): New World Warblers. Christopher Helm, London. 
 ffrench, Richard; O'Neill, John Patton & Eckelberry, Don R. (1991): A guide to the birds of Trinidad and Tobago (2nd edition). Comstock Publishing, Ithaca, N.Y. 
 Hilty, Steven L. (2003): Birds of Venezuela. Christopher Helm, London.

External links

Parula pitiayumi: Vocalizations from "Avifauna of the Interior of Ceará, Brasil"

tropical parula
Birds of the Rio Grande valleys
Birds of Central America
Birds of South America
Birds of Trinidad and Tobago
tropical parula
tropical parula